This is a list of law schools in China including Hong Kong and Macau.

Mainland China 

 China University of Political Science and Law
 China Youth College for Political Science
 Chinese Academy of Social Science, the Department of Law
 Chinese People's Public Security University
 Chinese University for Nationalities, Faculty of Law
 East China University of Politics and Law
 Foreign Affairs Institute, the International Law Department
 Fudan University School of Law
 Jilin University Law School
 Nankai University Law School
 Peking University Law School
 Peking University School of Transnational Law in Shenzhen, China
 Renmin University of China Law School
 Shanghai Jiao Tong University KoGuan Law school
 Sichuan University Law School
 Southwest University of Political Science & Law
 Sun Yat Sen University School of Law
 Tsinghua University School of Law
 Tianjin Normal University Law School
 Tongji University Law School
 Beijing University of International Business and Economics
 Wuhan University Law School
 Xiamen University Law School
 Zhongnan University of Economics and Law
 Lanzhou University Law School
 Central University of Finance and Economics Law School

List of law schools in Hong Kong
 Chinese University of Hong Kong, Faculty of Law
 City University of Hong Kong School of Law
 University of Hong Kong Faculty of Law

Hong Kong Baptist University's Department of Accountancy and Law is not a law school, but provides legal education related to business and accountancy.

See also List of law schools in Hong Kong

List of law schools in Macau

 University of Macau, Faculty of Law
 Macau University of Science and Technology

See also
 List of universities in China

References

 Ranking China's Law Schools
 China University of Political Science and Law
 China Youth College for Political Science
 Chinese Academy of Social Science, the Department of Law
 Chinese People's Public Security University
 Chinese University for Nationalities, Faculty of Law
 Chinese University of Hong Kong, Faculty of Law
 City University of Hong Kong School of Law
 East China University of Political Science and Law
 Foreign Affairs Institute, the International Law Department
 Hong Kong Baptist University, Department of Accountancy and Law
 Hong Kong University Faculty of Law
 Jilin University Law School
 Nankai University Law School
 Peking University Law School
 Peking University School of Transnational Law in Shenzhen, China
 Renmin University Law School
 Tongji University Law School
 South-West University of Politics and Law
 Sun Yat Sen University School of Law
 Tsinghua University School of Law
 University de Macau, Faculty of Law
 Beijing University of International Business and Economics
 Xiamen University Law School
 Wuhan University Law School
 Zhongnan University of Economics and Law

China

Law